The rat-tail radish (Chinese: t , s , shǔwěi luóbó), serpent radish, or tail-pod radish is a plant of the radish genus Raphanus named for its edible seed pods. Linnaeus described it as the species Raphanus caudatus; it is now sometimes treated as a variety of the common radish (R. sativus), either caudatus or mougri.

It is found primarily in India and Southeast Asia and is believed to have originated in China.  It was first known in the West no later than 1815, when introduced into England from Java.

References

External links 
 Information from the Missouri Botanical Garden

 Information from the Plants for a Future database
 Article from Kitchen Gardeners International with historical information, detailed description, recipes, and references

caudatus
Pod vegetables